The verb is one of the most complex parts of Basque grammar. It is sometimes represented as a difficult challenge for learners of the language, and many Basque grammars devote most of their pages to lists or tables of verb paradigms. This article does not give a full list of verb forms; its purpose is to explain the nature and structure of the system.

Verb stems
One of the remarkable characteristics of the Basque verb is the fact that only a very few verbs can be conjugated synthetically (i.e. have morphological finite forms); the rest only have non-finite forms, which can enter into a wide variety of compound tense structures (consisting of a non-finite verb form combined with a finite auxiliary) and are conjugated in this way (periphrastically).

Synthetically conjugated verbs like 'come' can also be conjugated periphrastically. A few synthetic forms occurring in twentieth-century Basque literature are even a posteriori extrapolations or back-formations of historically unattested forms, created for stylistic, poetic or puristic purposes.

Traditionally Basque verbs are cited using a non-finite form conventionally referred to as the participle (although not all its uses are really participial). Other non-finite forms can be derived from the participle, as will be seen in a later section. When the verb possesses synthetic finite forms, these are based on an ultimate stem (called the "basic stem" here) which is normally also present in the participle. For example, the verb  'come' has the basic stem -tor- from which are derived both the participle  (with the non-finite prefix e- and the participle suffix -i) and the finite present stem -ator- and non-present stem -etor-.

The participle is generally obtained from the basic stem by prefixing e- or i- (there is no rule; if the stem begins with a vowel, j- is prefixed instead), and suffixing -i (to stems ending in a consonant) or -n (to stems ending in a vowel). Occasionally there is no suffix. The verbal noun stem, another non-finite form, is obtained by replacing the suffixes -i and -n (and also -tu or -du, see below) of the participle by either -tze or -te. A third non-finite form which we shall call the "short stem" is obtained from the participle by omitting any of these suffixes except -n, which is retained in the short stem in those verbs whose participle has it.

A larger number of Basque verbs have no finite forms, but their non-finite forms follow the same pattern described above (they show an e-/i-/j- prefix, and the participle ends in -i, -n or occasionally zero.

There is also another large group of verbs which again have only non-finite forms, in which the non-finite stem is unanalysable (as a verb, at least), thus there is no e-/i-/j- prefix. In most cases the participle of such verbs has the suffix -tu (-du if the stem ends in n or l). Occasionally we find zero or -i instead. This is replaced by -tze or -te in the verbal noun, and by nothing in the short stem. The stems of these secondary verbs may be (1) a nominal or other non-verbal stem (e.g. poz-tu, garbi-tu...), (2) a phrase (e.g. ohera-tu), (3) a Latin or Romance verbal stem (e.g. barka-tu, kanta-tu...) or (4) an unanalysable (primary) verb stem (e.g. har-tu).

Defective or anomalous verb stems

Izan ('be')
The verb 'to be', the most common verb in the language, is irregular and shows some stem allomorphy in its finite forms. Its participle is izan.

Egon
Another verb, is used in western dialects (and in writing) as a second verb 'to be' in a way similar to  estar in Spanish.

Izan ('have')
The verb 'to have', also extremely common, also shows irregularities in its finite conjugation. In western and central dialects and in standard Basque, izan is used as its participle, i.e. the same participle as for 'to be'; the two meanings are disambiguated by the context. Given that Basque verbs are conventionally cited in their participle form, this presents a problem for metalinguistic terminology, because the verb izan is ambiguous.

Ukan/*Edun
Eastern dialects avoid this ambiguity by using ukan as the participle of 'to have', reserving izan for 'to be', and some grammarians employ izan and ukan in this way for convenience, but this could create confusion since most Basque speakers do not actually employ ukan (or even know it as a metalinguistic term). Other grammarians refer to 'to have' as *edun, which is a hypothetical, unattested form derived from the finite stem -du-; again, the problem is that *edun does not exist in real Basque usage.

To avoid such problems, this article simply refers to "the verb 'to be'" and "the verb 'to have'".

*Edin, *Ezan
The two standard aorist auxiliaries (see below) lack any non-finite forms, and so also have no obvious citation forms. As with *edun, some grammars construct hypothetical participles based on the finite stems, referring to *edin (the intransitive aorist auxiliary) and *ezan (the transitive aorist auxiliary).

Eduki
There is another verb which also means 'have', at least in western dialects, namely . As a lexical verb (rather than an auxiliary), many speakers and writers frequently use this verb. (This is somewhat reminiscent of, though not entirely parallel to, the Spanish distribution of haber and tener.)

Esan
The verb esan ('to say') possesses finite forms which have a different stem, -io- (e.g. diot 'I say'). Some grammarians treat these as different defective verbs, while others consider them a single word with stem allomorphy.

Synthetic conjugation

Tense structure and stem forms

Synthetic (single-word) conjugation involves the following finite "tenses":

Finite verbs have a basic finite stem that is either an unanalysable lexical root (e.g. -bil- 'go about, move (intr.)') or such a root preceded by the causative/intensive prefix -ra- (e.g. -rabil- 'cause to move, use'). The present stem is used in the present tense, the present potential tense and the non-third-person imperative, e.g. present d-abil 'he/she/it goes about', present potential d-abil-ke 'he/she/it may go about', second-person imperative h-abil! 'go about!'. The non-present stem is used in the past and hypothetic tenses (non-potential and potential), and in third-person imperative forms, e.g. z-ebil-en 'he/she/it went about', ba-l-ebil 'if he/she/it went about', z-ebil-ke-en 'he/she/it might or would have gone about', l-ebil-ke 'he/she/it might or would go about', b-ebil! 'let him/her/it go about!' (not in common use).

Non-present stems are further characterised by prefixes containing an n whenever the primary index (defined below) is non-third-person, e.g. z-ebil-en 'he went about' but n-enbil-en 'I went about', h-enbil-en 'you went about';  'he would use it' but  'he would use me'.

The suffix -(e)n is a marker of the past tenses, and -ke of the potential tenses (the past potential has both: -ke-en). The hypothetic non-potential tense usually occurs with the subordinator prefix ba- 'if', which will therefore be shown in examples; use of ba- is not restricted to the hypothetic, however (e.g. ba-dabil 'if he goes about', etc.). Apart from the tense markers mentioned, third-person prefixes distinguish between present, past, hypothetic and imperative tenses, as will be seen below.

Synopses of two verbs are given in the following table as illustrations. The verb 'to be' (izan) is irregular but in extremely frequent use, because it also serves as an important auxiliary. The verb ibili 'go about, move, etc.' (root -bil-) is regularly conjugated, although not all its synthetic forms are in widespread use. This synoptic table shows third-person forms.

Primary person indices

All conjugating verb stems (unless defective) can take the following set of person-indexing prefixes: n- (first-person singular), h- (second-person singular informal), g- (first-person plural), z- (second-person singular formal and second-person plural). With intransitive verbs, these prefixes index the subject; with transitives, they index the direct object. For convenience, we shall refer to this as the set of 'primary person indices'.

The following table shows some examples of how these prefixes combine with verb stems to produce a wide range of finite verb forms.

Third-person forms

Third-person verbs (here the 'person' again refers to the subject in intransitive verbs but the object in transitives) also take a prefix, which is invariable for number (singular or plural) but varies for tense, as follows: d- is used in the present tense, z- in the past, l- in the hypothetic and b- in third-person imperative forms (generally archaic or literary).

Some illustrative examples follow.

Plural marking

Plural number is marked in finite verbs in various ways, depending on the arguments whose plurality is being indexed. One set of plural forms are 'primary', that is, once again they refer to either the 'intransitive subject' or the 'transitive object' (the absolutive case agreement). The form of primary plural marking varies irregularly according to the verb stem, and may involve miscellaneous stem changes or the placement of a plural marker immediately adjacent to the singular stem (-z, -zki, -tza, it-, -te). Singular and plural forms of some finite verb stems are shown in the following table.

Primary plural marking occurs whenever the indexed argument (subject or direct object) is plural. The second-person singular polite (pronoun zu) is also treated as plural for this purpose (because originally it was a second-person plural), although syntactically and semantically singular. To index the second-person plural (pronoun zuek), in addition to the markers corresponding to zu a further ('secondary') plural marker -te is suffixed.

Ergative person and number suffixes

The ergative case is the case of subjects of transitive verbs. Such arguments are indexed in a different way from 'primary' arguments. Person of the ergative marker may be indexed in one of two ways: using suffixes or prefixes. The ergative-index plural marker is always a suffix (-te). The ergative person suffixes are as follows; those for the first- and second-person singular end in -a whenever another suffix morpheme follows them. The absence of an ergative suffix in transitive verbs (except those discussed in the next section) implies a third-person subject.

A few sample paradigms follow.

Ergative person prefixes

Instead of the ergative suffixes, ergative prefixes are used to index first- or second-person ergative arguments if the tense is non-present and the direct object is third person (see the gaps in the previous table). The ergative prefixes are identical to the primary prefixes in the singular, but in the plural -en- is added to the primary prefix forms:

The ergative plural suffix -te only occurs when required (a) to indicate the third person plural, or (b) to indicate the (real) second-person plural.

Dative argument indices

Finite verbs that have an argument in the dative case also index the dative argument using the following set of dative suffixes (which are identical in form to the ergative suffixes except in the third person):

Both intransitive and transitive verbs may take dative indices, and the mechanism for incorporating these is the same in either case. Dative suffixes immediately follow the verb stem, preceding other suffixes such as the ergative suffixes (thus in d-i-da-zu 'you have it to me', -da- is the dative suffix and -zu is the ergative suffix) or the potential suffix -ke (as well as the past suffix -(e)n, which is always word-final).

Only the primary plural marker, if present, and the dative-argument marker precede the dative suffix. The dative-argument marker, whose regular form is -ki-, is added to basic verb stems to indicate that these are taking a dative argument. With -ki-, the primary plural marker always takes the form of -z- immediately preceding -ki-. A few verb stems have an irregular dative-argument form.

The most commonly used dative verb forms are those of the irregular verbs 'to be' and 'to have', which are in constant use as tense auxiliaries, when these verbs have no lexical meaning of their own. This is the reason why many of the glosses given below sound odd (e.g. dit 'he has it to me'); an example of a more natural-sounding use of this form as an auxiliary would be eman dit 'he has given it to me'. Nevertheless, the following table serves to clarify the morphological structure of dative-argument verb forms.

Familiar forms and allocutive indices (hika)

The obligatory grammatical characteristics of this mode are:

 The personal pronoun  is used (rather than the polite second-person singular pronoun ).
 All finite verb forms that index a second-person argument take (as one would expect) the corresponding  forms, e.g.  "you are" (rather than ),  or  "you have it" (rather than duzu), etc.:

 Obligatorily in independent declarative clauses with finite verb forms not indexing a true second-person argument, an additional second-person index is incorporated. This is known as the allocutive construction, and we may refer to these second-person indices that do not refer to a syntactic argument of the verb as "allocutive indices".

The allocutive suffixes are identical in form to the ergative and dative suffixes.

Allocutive suffixes follow the dative suffixes, the potential -ke- and ergative third-person plural -te-, and precedes other ergative suffixes (except for the synthetic forms of the verb esan with plural object). Depending on the verb in question, there may also be some other changes:
The allocutive forms of the verb "to be" (izan) without a dative argument use the root -(it)u-. They are identical to the forms of the verb "to have", except for third-person in non-present tenses:

In the allocutive forms of the verb "to have" (izan) without a dative argument the -u- in the root changes to -i- (so the root becomes -(it)i). Some form are identical to the forms of the verb "to have" with dative argument

In all other verb forms, the procedure is as follows, sometimes (there is considerable dialectal variation on this point), the third-person present-tense primary prefix d- changes to z- and/or the present-tense stem formant -a- changes to -ia- or -e- in the allocutive forms.
 In standard Basque, d- changes to z- in transitive aorist auxiliaries (*ezan) and all non-auxiliary verbs. The present-tense format may or may not change to -e-. If the allocutive suffix immediately follows the verb stem ending in a consonant, a vowel is inserted (-a- after -z- pluralizer, -e- otherwise).
 In the synthetic forms of the verb esan with plural object, the allocutive suffix is placed after the pluralizer -z- (which, as an exception, is placed after an ergative suffix). In the singular forms of this verb the allocutive suffix is placed as usual (i.e. before ergative suffix).

The rules are similar. 
Such dialects have three levels of address:
allocutive  (with a female/male distinction) is the most intimate
the absence of allocutive constructions is the most neutral or formal
But most dialects lack the middle level.

The use of  forms is diminishing being perceived as more direct and close, but also rural and impolite.
Even among who use them, the masculine forms are more frequently used than the feminine ones, sometimes even using masculine forms for women.
An explanation is that, in the rural exodus of Basque peasants, men would end up working in a factory with people of their same town, while women became maids, shop clerks or waitresses where informal Basque would be felt improper.

Periphrastic conjugation

Compound tense stem forms

Compound tense forms consist of a non-finite verb form (the compound tense stem) and a finite auxiliary form. We shall begin by looking at the non-finite stems. Each verb has four: the perfect, future, imperfect and short stems. The perfect stem is identical to the participle (see above). The future stem is obtained from the participle by adding -ko (-go after n). The imperfect stem is the verbal noun (see above) plus the suffix -n. The form of the short stem was discussed above. Some examples follow.

Compound tense auxiliaries

By combining the four compound tense stems with various auxiliaries, one obtains four groups of compound tense, sometimes referred to in Basque grammar as "aspects", which we shall call Imperfect, Perfect, Future and Aorist (= "aspect"-less) respectively.

The choice of auxiliary depends on the "aspect" and also on whether the verb is intransitive or transitive. Except in the aorist, the auxiliary for intransitives is the verb 'to be', while that for transitives is the verb 'to have'. In the Aorist a different pair of auxiliaries  is used, one for intransitives and another for transitives. Since neither of the latter is used other than as an auxiliary, and neither has a participle (or other non-finite form) to provide a convenient citation form, we shall simply refer to them as the (intransitive and transitive) aorist auxiliaries.

The auxiliaries adopt all the argument indices (for subject, direct object and/or indirect object as the case may be, as well as the allocutive where applicable) that correspond to the verb within its clause.

The above diagram illustrates the patterns with auxiliaries in the present tense. However, the same auxiliaries may be used in a wide variety of tenses, not only in the present. The following two tables lay out synoptically the possible auxiliary/tense combinations for intransitive and transitive auxiliaries respectively.

Simple and compound tenses

The following are the most usual Basque tenses. By considering both simple and compound tenses as part of a single list, one can better see how the whole system fits together and compare the tenses with each other.

More periphrastic constructions

Some other constructions that commonly express a range of aspectual or modal notions show a greater degree of periphrasis than those considered so far. A brief selection of some of the most important of these are shown in the following table:

Non-finite verb forms

Basque verbs have a fairly wide range of non-finite forms. Morphologically these can all be derived via suffixation from the three non-finite forms presented at the beginning of this article: the participle, the verbal noun and the short stem. Apart from the short stem (which has a rather limited set of functions), all other forms are built on either the participle or the verbal noun.

The participle and derived forms

The participle and some other non-finite forms derived therefrom are as follows. To avoid repetition, mention will not be made of the use of the participle as a perfect stem in the formation of periphrastic tenses (see above).

The verbal noun and derived forms

The verbal noun and some other non-finite forms derived therefrom are as follows. Again, to avoid repetition, mention will not be made of the use of the  form as an imperfect stem in the formation of periphrastic tenses (see above).

Compound verbs

Basque has a fairly large number of compound verbs of a type also known as light verb constructions, consisting of two parts. The first component is a lexical element which is often (but not always) an undeclined noun. The second is a common verb which contributes less semantic content to the construction but is the part that is conjugated, thus lending to the whole its verbal character. Details of conjugation depend on the light verb used, which may be one that has synthetic finite forms (e.g. izan), or a verb without synthetic finite forms (e.g. egin or hartu).

Compound verbs, especially those with the light verb , offer an alternative way (besides direct derivation with -tu, as seen above) for incorporating new verbs into the language, either through the incorporation of onomatopoeic words ( 'bite', oka 'vomit',  'sip' or 'slurp',  'click' ... ) or of loanwords ( 'dance', salto 'jump' etc.) as lexical components.

Verbal particles

A small set of modal particles, including al, ote and omen only occur immediately preceding finite forms (i.e. in front of a synthetic finite form or the synthetic part of an auxiliary verb).

The only exception is that ote and omen are sometimes used in isolation where the ellipsis of a verb is understood. E.g. Egia ote? 'I wonder if it's true' is easily recognised by speakers to be an ellipsis of Egia ote da? Or if someone says Badator 'She's coming.' and someone else responds Omen! 'Supposedly!', this is as much as to say that the first utterance should incorporate omen, i.e. Ba omen dator 'Supposedly she is coming.'

Another set of preverbal particles consists of the affirmative particle ba- (by modern convention joined to a following finite verb form) and the negator ez. These are compatible with the modal particles, which they precede (e.g. ba omen dator in the preceding paragraph; ez al dakizu? 'don't you know?', etc.); apart from this, they too immediately precede the finite verb form.

Subordinator affixes

The forms of verbs cited throughout the general presentation of the finite verb system are normally those that occur in main clauses. (However, certain forms, such as the non-potential hypothetic, e.g. -litz, or the subjunctive, e.g.

In subordinate clauses, the finite verb takes a subordinator affix, i.e. a suffix or prefix which establishes (to some extent) the kind of subordination. Basically there are four such affixes, two suffixes and two prefixes, and one (and only one) of these is found in every subordinate form.

Both of the suffixes, however, may take further suffixes (mostly nominal declension suffixes) which serve to further specify the type of subordination. The following table provides a brief overview of some of the main uses and forms.

Bibliography
(see also the bibliography in Basque grammar)

 Allières, Jacques (1983). De la formalisation du système verbal basque. Article in Pierres Lafitte-ri omenaldia, pp. 37–39, Bilbo: Euskaltzaindia. (in French)
 Bonaparte, L-L. (1869). Le verbe basque en tableaux. London. (in French)
 Euskara Institutua, Euskal Herriko Unibertsitatea (UPV/EHU) (2013), "Euskal Adizkitegi Automatikoa" (Automatic Basque Verbal Forms Generator)
 Euskaltzaindia (1973). Aditz laguntzaile batua. (in Basque)
 Euskaltzaindia (1987). Euskal gramatika: lehen urratsak (volume 2). Bilbao: Euskaltzaindia. (in Basque)
 Euskaltzaindia (1994). Adizki alokutiboak (hikako moldea) (in Basque)

References

External links

Verbs by language
Verb